North Carolina Highway 152 (NC 152) is a  primary state highway in the U.S. state of North Carolina.  It serves as the main thoroughfare in southern Rowan County.

Route description
NC 152 is a predominantly two-lane highway that traverses  from NC 150 in Mooresville to U.S. Route 52 (US 52) in Rockwell.

History
NC 150 was established in 1930 as a new primary routing from NC 150 east of Mooresville to NC 80 in Rockwell.  By 1955, NC 152 was extended through downtown Mooresville replacing parts of NC 150 and NC 150A. In August 2003, NC 152 was realigned in downtown Mooresville to follow NC 3 to its northern terminus with NC 150, thus becoming NC 152's current western terminus. In December 2003, NC 152 was rerouted in China Grove, upgrading East Church Street (SR 1337) to US 29, then taking the immediate interchange to its north back onto its alignment. The old routing along North Main Street was downgraded to secondary roads.

Junction list

Special routes

Mooresville truck route

North Carolina Highway 152 Truck (NC 152 Truck) overlaps entirely with NC 150 (Oakridge Farm Road) in Mooresville.

References

External links

 
 NCRoads.com: N.C. 152

Transportation in Iredell County, North Carolina
Transportation in Rowan County, North Carolina
152